The Saranac Stakes is an American Thoroughbred horse race run annually at Saratoga Race Course in Saratoga Springs, New York. The Grade III stakes is open to three-year-old horses and is raced on turf over a distance of 1 mile. The event, currently run in early September, raised its purse to $300,000 in 2014.

Inaugurated in 1901, the race is named for the village of Saranac in Clinton County, New York in the Adirondack Mountains. Due to a legislated ban on parimutuel betting, all New York State racetracks ceased operations in 1911 and 1912. Cancellation of the race occurred again from 1943 to 1947 as a result of World War II. When it returned in 1948, the race was shifted to the now defunct Jamaica Racetrack until 1956 when it was moved to Aqueduct Racetrack where it was held from 1957–1961, 1963–1967, 1972–1974, and in 1976.

Raced on dirt until 1979, over the years the Saranac Stakes has been run at various distances:
 1 mile, 1 furlong: 1901–1908, 1910, 1996
  miles: 1948–1959
 1 mile: 1960–1995
  miles: 1997–2010
  miles: 2011–2018
  miles: 2019
 1 mile: 2020 to present

Records
Most wins by an owner:
 5 – Greentree Stable (1923, 1957, 1963, 1968, 1978)

Most wins by a jockey:
 7 – Eddie Maple (1972, 1975, 1981, 1983, 1986, 1987, 1992)
Most wins by an trainer:

 5 – Woody Stephens (1975, 1981, 1983, 1986, 1988)

Winners of the Saranac Stakes since 1938

* In 1989, the race was run in two divisions.

Earlier winners

 1937 – Burning Star
 1936 – Sun Teddy
 1935 – Good Gamble
 1934 – Kievex
 1933 – War Glory
 1932 – Morfair
 1931 – Danour
 1930 – Whichone
 1929 – Hard Tack
 1928 – Sun Edwin
 1927 – Osmand
 1926 – Mars
 1925 – Peanuts
 1924 – Sarazen
 1923 – Cherry Pie
 1922 – Little Chief
 1921 – Crocus
 1920 – Dinna Care
 1919 – Purchase
 1918 – Motor Cop
 1917 – Midway
 1916 – Dodge
 1915 – Regret
 1914 – Stromboli
 1913 – Ten Point
 1910 – Martinez
 1909 – Field Mouse
 1908 – Golconda
 1907 – Vails
 1906 – Gallavant
 1905 – Dandelion
 1904 – Dolly Spanker
 1903 – Molly Brant
 1902 – Hermis
 1901 – Dublin

Graded stakes races in the United States
Grade 3 stakes races in the United States
Flat horse races for three-year-olds
Horse races in New York (state)
Turf races in the United States
Saratoga Race Course
Recurring sporting events established in 1901
1901 establishments in New York (state)